This page lists cultural depictions of Herod the Great, grouped by order and arranged by date.

Art and literature

Plays
Herod appears in some cycles of the Mystery Plays, such as the pageant Herod the Great in the Towneley Cycle, played as an over-the-top villain. Such portrayals were still in folk memory in William Shakespeare's time, for Hamlet instructs the players not to "out-Herod Herod" (Act 3, Scene 2). This line is in turn quoted in regard to Prince Prospero in Edgar Allan Poe's "The Mask of the Red Death." Medieval dramatic portrayals of Herod may also have influenced Shakespeare's portrayal of Macbeth, King of Scotland in Macbeth.
Herod the Great is a central character in Elizabeth Cary's The Tragedy of Mariam, the Fair Queen of Jewry (1613). The play is a work of historical fiction, set in 29 B.C., revolving around Herod's second wife, Mariam, and their families, when Herod is believed to have been killed by Octavian (later Caesar Augustus).
Oscar Wilde's play Salome (play) portrays king Herod during his rule of Judea. In the play Herod is described as the "son of a camel driver" by his wife Herodias, who reminds him it is her royal bloodline that put him on the throne. Oscar Wilde's Herod is a crude and despicable figure, constantly indulging in his royal treasures and pleasures; In a desperate plea to his daughter-in-law Salome, he swears to reward her with anything her heart desires if she were to present him with a lewd dance. After the dance, the defiled and humiliated Salome asks for the head of Jean the Baptist, who is kept in the cellar as Herod's prisoner. Throughout the play, Herod is the only one who can hear the dark omens of death that Jean the Baptist has been warning of, and is afraid of harming the holy man. After begging Salome to change her mind, offering her half his kingdom instead, he reluctantly submits. To everyone's horror, Salome proceeds to kiss the bloody head, resulting in Herod ordering her immediate execution.

Opera
Herod is one of the main characters in Richard Strauss's operatic adaptation of Oscar Wilde's play Salome (opera). Written for tenor voice, the music colors his vile and sycophantic persona, ranging between expressive melodic lines, terrified whispering and full on tantrums. It is an astoundingly difficult part to sing.

Film, radio and television

Film
From the Manger to the Cross (1912), played by George Kellog
The Star of Bethlehem (1912), played by William Russell
Cleopatra (1934), played by Joseph Schildkraut
King of Kings (1961), played by Grégoire Aslan
The Greatest Story Ever Told (1965), played by Claude Rains
The 3 Kings (2000), played by Ron Moody
The Nativity Story (2006), played by Ciarán Hinds
The Star (2017), voiced by Christopher Plummer

Radio
He appears in the first play of Dorothy L. Sayers' radio play cycle The Man Born to Be King.

Television
Jesus of Nazareth (1977), played by Peter Ustinov
The Nativity (1978), played by Leo McKern
Rome (2007, episode 19, Death Mask), played by René Zagger
The Bible (2013, episode 3, Hope), played by Sam Douglas
Killing Jesus (2015), played by Kelsey Grammer

References